The Rouyn-Noranda Capitales were a Junior "A" ice hockey team from Rouyn-Noranda, Quebec, Canada.

History
This defunct hockey team was a part of the Northern Ontario Junior Hockey League.  The team disbanded to make way for their city's Quebec Major Junior Hockey League franchise, the Rouyn-Noranda Huskies.

The Capitales were the first Québécois team in NOJHL history.  The Capitales left in 1996.  There would not be a new Quebec-based team in the league until 2008 when the NOJHL allowed the expansion of the Temiscaming Royals.

Season-by-season results

Defunct ice hockey teams in Canada
Ice hockey teams in Quebec
Sport in Rouyn-Noranda
Northern Ontario Junior Hockey League teams